The Edward W. Haviland House is a historic home located at Port Deposit, Cecil County, Maryland, United States. It is a -story, 12-room, stuccoed frame building constructed in 1913 in the Dutch Colonial style. In 1926, a large frame double garage and carriage house was built to the rear of the main house. The house was designed by architect Charles J. McDowell.

The Edward W. Haviland House was listed on the National Register of Historic Places in 2000.

References

External links
, including photo from 1999, Maryland Historical Trust

Houses on the National Register of Historic Places in Maryland
Houses in Cecil County, Maryland
Colonial Revival architecture in Maryland
Houses completed in 1913
1913 establishments in Maryland
National Register of Historic Places in Cecil County, Maryland